Maren Haugli (born 3 March 1985) is a Norwegian retired long track speed skater who participated in international competitions.

She represents the sports club Jevnaker IF and is the granddaughter of Sverre Ingolf Haugli and sister of Sverre Haugli.

Personal records

Career highlights

Olympic Winter Games
2006 - Torino, 15th at 3000 m
2006 - Torino, 19th at 1500 m
2006 - Torino, 8th at 5000 m
2006 - Torino, 7th at team pursuit
World Allround Championships
2005 - Moscow, 22nd
2006 - Calgary, 5th
2009 - Hamar,  10th
World Single Distance Championships
2005 - Inzell, 12th at 3000 m
2005 - Inzell, 11th at 5000 m
World Sprint Championships
2007 - Hamar, 27th
European Allround Championships
2005 - Heerenveen, 13th
2006 - Hamar, 5th
2007 - Collalbo, 9th
2008 - Kolomna,  14th
2009 - Heerenveen,  9th
World Cup
2006 - Heerenveen,  3rd at 3000 m
World Junior Allround Championships
2001 - Groningen, 23rd
2002 - Collalbo, 35th
2003 - Kushiro, 30th
2004 - Roseville, Minnesota, 17th
National Championships
2003 - Bergen,  3rd at allround
2004 - Oslo,  3rd at allround
2005 - Larvik,  3rd at 500 m
2005 - Larvik,  1st at 3000 m
2005 - Larvik,  3rd at 1500 m
2006 - Hamar,  1st at 1500 m
2006 - Hamar,  2nd at 1000 m
2006 - Hamar,  1st at 3000 m
2006 - Arendal,  1st at 5000 m
2006 - Arendal,  1st at allround
2006 - Asker,  2nd at sprint
2007 - Hamar,  1st at1500 m
2007 - Hamar,  1st at 3000 m
2008 - Hamar,  2nd at 1500 m
2008 - Hamar,  2nd 1st at 3000 m
2008 - Bjugn,  2nd at allround
2009 - Hamar,  1st at1500 m
2009 - Hamar,  1st at 3000 m
2009 - Gol ,  1st at allround

External links 
 
 Maren Haugli by speedskatingphotos-by-biseth
 Haugli at Jakub Majerski's Speedskating Database
 Haugli at SkateResults.com
 Photos of Maren Haugli

1985 births
Living people
Norwegian female speed skaters
People from Oppland
Speed skaters at the 2006 Winter Olympics
Speed skaters at the 2010 Winter Olympics
Olympic speed skaters of Norway
Place of birth missing (living people)
Sportspeople from Innlandet